Aleksandr Dyadchuk (born 5 February 1983 in Alma-Ata) is a Kazakhstani sprint canoer who competed in the late 2000s and 2010s. At the 2008 Summer Olympics in Beijing, he was eliminated in the semifinals of the C-2 500 m event.  At the 2012 Summer Olympics he was eliminated in the semi-finals of the C-1 200 m and the C-1 1000 m.

References

External links
Sports-Reference.com profile

1983 births
Canoeists at the 2008 Summer Olympics
Canoeists at the 2012 Summer Olympics
Kazakhstani male canoeists
Living people
Sportspeople from Almaty
Olympic canoeists of Kazakhstan
Asian Games medalists in canoeing
Canoeists at the 2006 Asian Games
Canoeists at the 2010 Asian Games
Asian Games gold medalists for Kazakhstan
Asian Games silver medalists for Kazakhstan
Medalists at the 2006 Asian Games
Medalists at the 2010 Asian Games
21st-century Kazakhstani people